Travnik is a village in Kavarna Municipality, Dobrich Province, northeastern Bulgaria.

Travnik Buttress in Antarctica is named after the village.

References

Villages in Dobrich Province